The 709th Airlift Squadron is part of the 512th Airlift Wing at Dover Air Force Base, Delaware.

The squadron was first activated during World War II as the 709th Bombardment Squadron.  After training in the United States, it deployed to the European Theater, where it engaged in the strategic bombing campaign against Germany.  After V-E Day, it returned to the United States, where it was inactivated in the fall of 1945.

The squadron was briefly activated in the reserves from 1947 to 1949.  In 1973, the squadron was redesignated the 709th Military Airlift Squadron and activated at Dover as a reserve associate unit of the 436th Military Airlift Wing.  Its reservists operated the 436th's C-5s alongside members of the regular Air Force.

Mission
Since 1973 the squadron has trained for and flown airlift missions with the Lockheed C-5 Galaxy, It also participates in military exercises and global humanitarian and contingency operations.

History

World War II

Training in the United States
The squadron was first activated on 1 May 1943 at Ephrata Army Air Base, Washington as the 709th Bombardment Squadron, one of the four squadrons of the 447th Bombardment Group.

The original mission of the squadron was to be an Operational Training Unit. However, by the time the 447th Group reached full strength in October it had been identified for overseas deployment and its key personnel were sent to the Army Air Forces School of Applied Tactics at Orlando Army Air Base, Florida for advanced tactical training. The cadre trained at Brooksville Army Air Field with the 1st Bombardment Squadron, engaging in simulated attacks against Mobile, Alabama, Charleston, South Carolina and New Orleans. The squadron then trained at Rapid City Army Air Base, South Dakota with the 17th Bombardment Training Wing. In June 1943 the group moved to Harvard Army Air Field, Nebraska for Phase I training. The squadron's B-17s began to move from the United States to the European theater of operations in November 1943.

Combat in the European Theater

The squadron was stationed at RAF Rattlesden, England, from December 1943 to August 1945. It flew its first combat mission on 24 December 1943 against a V-1 flying bomb launch site near Saint-Omer in Northern France.

From December 1943 to May 1944, the squadron helped prepare for the invasion of the European continent by attacking submarine pens, naval installations, and cities in Germany; missile sites and ports in France; and airfields and marshaling yards in France, Belgium and Germany. The squadron conducted heavy bombardment missions against German aircraft industry during Big Week, 20 to 25 February 1944.

The unit supported Operation Overlord, the invasion of Normandy in June 1944 by bombing airfields and other targets. On D-Day the squadron bombed the beachhead area using pathfinder aircraft.

The squadron aided in Operation Cobra, the breakthrough at Saint Lo, France, and the effort to take Brest, France, from July to September 1944. It bombed strategic targets from October to December 1944, concentrating on sources of oil production. It assaulted marshalling yards, railroad bridges and communication centers during the Battle of the Bulge from December 1944 to January 1945. In March 1945 the group bombed an airfield in support of Operation Varsity, the airborne assault across the Rhine.  The unit flew its last combat mission on 21 April 1945 against a marshalling yard at Ingolstadt, Germany.

The 709th redeployed to the United States during the summer 1945. The air echelon ferried their aircraft and personnel back to the United States, leaving on 29 and 30 June 1945. The squadron ground echelon, along with the 711th squadron sailed 3 August 1945 on the SS Benjamin R. Milam, from Liverpool.  Most personnel were discharged at Camp Myles Standish after arrival at the port of Boston.  A small cadre proceeded to Drew Field, Florida and the squadron inactivated on 7 November 1945.

Pre-Korean War reserve operations
Two years later, on 25 July 1947, the 709th was redesignated the 709th Bombardment Squadron, Very Heavy. It was activated under Air Defense Command (ADC) in the reserves on 10 November 1947, at Bergstrom Field Texas, although it does not appear that the squadron was fully manned or equipped with tactical aircraft.  In July 1948, Continental Air Command (ConAC) assumed reserve training responsibility from ADC.    President Truman's reduced 1949 defense budget required reductions in the number of units in the Air Force.  As a result, the squadron was inactivated in June 1949 when its parent group moved to Castle Air Force Base, California and became a corollary unit of the 93d Bombardment Group.

Reserve associate operations
The squadron was redesignated the 709th Military Airlift Squadron and activated as a Military Airlift Command reserve associate C-5 Galaxy squadron in 1973 and was associated with the 436th Military Airlift Wing.  The associate program meshes active-duty and reserve units using the active-duty host aircraft and equipment for training.

Since 1973 the 709th has trained for and flown airlift missions, participating in exercises and global humanitarian and contingency operations.

In December 1989 through January 1990, the 709th participated in Operation Just Cause, which removed Manuel Noriega from power in Panama. Later that year, the squadron was called to active duty to support Operations Desert Shield and Desert Storm. In 2004 and 2005 reserve crews from Dover supported humanitarian relief operations following the tsunami in Indonesia and Hurricane Katrina.

Lineage
 Constituted as the 709th Bombardment Squadron (Heavy) on 6 April 1943
 Activated on 1 May 1943
 Redesignated 709th Bombardment Squadron, Heavy on 20 August 1943
 Inactivated on 7 November 1945
 Redesignated 709th Bombardment Squadron, Very Heavy on 24 October 1947
 Activated in the reserve on 10 November 1947
 Inactivated on 27 June 1949
 Redesignated 709 Military Airlift Squadron (Associate) on 19 June 1973
 Activated in the Reserve on 1 October 1973
 Redesignated 709th Airlift Squadron (Associate) on 1 February 1992
 Redesignated 709th Airlift Squadron on 1 October 1994

Assignments
 447th Bombardment Group, 1 May 1943 – 7 November 1945
 447th Bombardment Group, 10 November 1947 – 27 June 1949
 512th Military Airlift Wing (later 512 Airlift Wing), 1 October 1973
 512th Operations Group, 1 August 1992 – present

Stations

 Ephrata Army Air Base, Washington, 1 May 1943
 Rapid City Army Air Base, South Dakota, 13 June 1943
 Harvard Army Airfield, Nebraska, 1 August 1943 – 11 November 1943
 RAF Rattlesden (AAF-126), England, 1 December 1943 – c. 3 August 1945

 Drew Field, Florida, 18 August 1945 – 7 November 1945
 Bergstrom Field (later Bergstrom Air Force Base), Texas, 10 November 1947 – 27 June 1949
 Dover Air Force Base, Delaware, 1 October 1973 – present

Aircraft
 Boeing B-17 Flying Fortress, 1943–1945
 Lockheed C-5 Galaxy, 1973–present

Awards and campaigns

See also

 List of Boeing B-17 Flying Fortress operators

References

Notes

Bibliography

Further reading

External links
  (Heraldic description and symbolism of unit emblem)
 
 

Airlift squadrons of the United States Air Force
Military units and formations of the United States Air Force Reserves
Military units and formations in Delaware